Twitches is a 2005 Disney Channel original movie, based on the Twitches book series published by Scholastic Press. Produced by Broomsticks Productions Limited, the film stars Tia Mowry and Tamera Mowry as Alexandra Fielding and Camryn Barnes, respectively. A sequel, Twitches Too, aired on October 12, 2007, as a part of Disney Channel's Hauntober Fest.

Plot
In the magical dimension of Coventry, the royal witch Miranda gives birth to identical twin daughters on Halloween night. The sisters are named Apolla and Artemis after the Olympian twins, the gods of the sun and moon, respectively; in accordance with their namesakes, Apolla wears an amulet in the shape of the sun and Artemis wears an amulet in the shape of the moon. Their father Aron DuBaer, a powerful warlock, transfers the entirety of his magical powers to protect them from an evil entity known as the Darkness and is killed in the process. Karsh and Ileana WarBurton, a magical couple and friends of the family, assume the task of protecting the twins and flee to a non-magical dimension known as Earth to give them up for adoption. Apolla is adopted by a wealthy couple who name her Camryn Elizabeth Barnes, while Artemis is adopted by a single mother and is named Alexandra "Alex" Nicole Fielding. Alex grows up to be a night owl and stays up until the moon sets, writing about the chronicles of magical twin sisters, unaware that her stories are true. She shares a single bedroom with her close friend Lucinda, after her mother passes away a few months prior to her 21st birthday. Meanwhile, Camryn is a passionate artist and a lark, who wakes up at sunrise to sketch realistic pictures; unbeknownst to her, the images she creates are of Miranda and her homeland Coventry. She is spoiled and outgoing, unlike her quiet and reclusive sister; however, the duo share the traits of kindness and intelligence.

On the twins' 21st birthday, Camryn and her best friend Beth decide to shop, while Alex tries to look for a job. After Karsh and Ileana manipulate Alex into entering the store where Camryn is trying on clothes, the sisters encounter each other for the first time since their infancy. Although Camryn is overjoyed to discover Alex, the latter flees the store, prompting the former to grasp her hand, causing a burst of energy. As their magic is released, they discover that they share a sisterly bond and attempt to understand each other. Karsh and Ileana reveal themselves to the twins and inform them about their magical background, after which Alex realizes that her stories about Coventry are true. According to an old prophecy, the sisters are the only ones capable of vanquishing the Darkness and restoring Coventry. As she has the gift of knowledge, Alex refuses to help fulfill the prophecy because her stories end with death. Camryn manages to convince Alex to stay, assuring her that they are unstoppable together, and the two practice their magical powers as they bond. They dub themselves Twitches, a portmanteau of the words "twin" and "witches."

In the meantime, Miranda senses that her daughters are alive and informs their uncle Thantos, whom she married after Aron's death. The Darkness arrives at Alex's apartment, but the sisters manage to transport themselves to Coventry, and the experience overwhelms Camryn. Despite her sister's pleas, she decides that she does not want to venture further into their destiny. She leaves to participate in her costume birthday party on Earth. Alex, determined to help Coventry without her sister, reunites with Miranda and meets Thantos, who informs her that if Camryn is alone, she is powerless against the Darkness. At her party, Camryn discovers that she used to draw a face in the Darkness and learns from it that Thantos is responsible for the Darkness, and she escapes to Coventry after Karsh and Ileana sacrifice themselves to help her. As she reveals their uncle's crimes to Miranda and Alex, Thantos arrives and admits to killing his brother Aron in an attempt to acquire wealth and power. Thantos then takes Miranda with him and goes on a rampage around the castle. The twins combine their magic of light and love to vanquish him and restore Coventry, simultaneously reviving their mother Miranda, Karsh, and Ileana. They then celebrate their birthday on Earth, alongside Miranda and Camryn's adoptive parents, David and Emily.

Cast
 Tia Mowry as Alexandra "Alex" Nicole Fielding / Artemis DuBaer
 Tamera Mowry as Camryn "Cam" Elizabeth Barnes / Apolla DuBaer
 Kristen Wilson as Miranda DuBaer, the twins' mother and Queen of Coventry. Remarries Thantos for the sake of Coventry. 
 David Ingram as Aron DuBaer, the twins' father. Killed by his own brother, Thantos.
 Patrick Fabian as Thantos DuBaer, the twins' evil uncle and step-father. Marries Miranda after Aron's death. Revealed to be the one who controls The Darkness.
 Jennifer Robertson as Ileana Warburton, one of the twins' guardians. She watches over Camryn.
 Pat Kelly as Karsh Warburton, one of the twins' guardians. He watches over Alex.
 Jessica Greco as Lucinda Carmelson, Alex's best friend. Alex lives with her after her mother's passing.
 Jackie Rosenbaum as Beth Fish, Camryn's Best Friend.
 Arnold Pinnock as David Barnes, Camryn's Father.
 Karen Holness as Emily Barnes, Camryn's Mother.
 Jessica Feliz as Nicole Carmelson, Lucinda's younger sister who loves Halloween.

Production

Casting
Originally, Tia was supposed to play Camryn and Tamera was supposed to play Alex, but the two wanted their roles to be switched. For the first few days of filming, the cast and crew had a hard time telling Tia and Tamera apart.

Filming
Production for the film began in June 2005, entirely shot in Toronto, Ontario. Special effects were used in conjunction with green screens to help simulate the magic tricks shown throughout the movie - the transitions between Earth and Coventry, the moon and sun put on the same horizon, and, with the aid of a wind machine, the visualization of the Darkness' presence.

Release

Broadcast
When the movie first aired on Disney Channel on October 14, 2005, it was viewed by 7 million viewers. In four subsequent airings during its first weekend, the movie drew a total of 21.5 million viewers and was the week's most popular cable program.

Home media
Twitches was released on Disney, in America  in 2008 and in Romania in  2009

Sequel
A sequel, Twitches Too, premiered on October 12, 2007 in the US, October 26, 2007 in Canada, and November 2, 2007 in the UK.

Notes

External links
  
 
 Twitches DVD site

2005 television films
2005 films
2000s English-language films
Disney Channel Original Movie films
Films based on classical mythology
American fantasy comedy films
Films about witchcraft
Films directed by Stuart Gillard
American films about Halloween
Films about twin sisters
Films based on American novels
Films set in Illinois
Films shot in Toronto
2000s American films